"The Mice" is an episode of the original The Outer Limits television show. It first aired on 6 January 1964, during the first season.

Opening narration

Plot
A convict named Chino Rivera, sentenced to life imprisonment after being charged with first degree homicide when he killed his sister's abusive husband, volunteers to be a human guinea pig for a matter transportation experiment. In reality, the experiment is supposed to be an exchange of technology between Earth and an alien race called the Chromoites. When an inhabitant of Chromo, designated as their 'volunteer', materializes in the testing lab, it creates havoc until it is finally subdued, and then allowed to freely explore the countryside surrounding the research facility. As problems ensue and researchers die, the convict is blamed, only to find that the Chromoite, after murdering one of the scientists, has been sent to Earth to experiment with ways of producing food, artificially, for his starving race. The doctor assigned to monitor the convict, following his injury when he attempted to escape, discovers the alien apparently eating an unknown substance that it had chemically germinated in a pond near the research facility, after they had previously informed the Earth scientists that their species sustained themselves through photosynthesis. The lead researcher re-establishes communication with the Chromo scientists, after capturing the 'volunteer', to admonish their actions, with them admitting their deception, believing that we would not have aided in their plight, while explaining that their 'volunteer' is actually one of their renowned scientists who is invaluable to their cause in finding a means of feeding the millions of inhabitants on Chromo. At that point, the researcher calmly states, "You could have asked...all you had to do was to ask".

Closing narration

Cast

References

External links

The Outer Limits (1963 TV series season 1) episodes
1964 American television episodes
Television episodes written by Joseph Stefano
Teleportation in fiction
Television episodes about alien visitations